William Thomas Winters, CBE (born September 1961) is an American banker who is the chief executive (CEO) of Standard Chartered, and was formerly co-head of JPMorgan Chase's investment bank.

Early life
William Thomas Winters was born in September 1961, in Connecticut. He earned a bachelor's degree in international relations from Colgate University, followed by an MBA from the Wharton School at the University of Pennsylvania. He has dual American and British nationality.

Career

JP Morgan
Winters was key in JP Morgan's development of credit derivatives markets.

He was appointed co-head of JP Morgan's investment bank along with Steve Black in 2004; Winters was based in London while Black's office was in New York City. Winters earned much credit for helping the investment bank avoid "structured products and off-balance sheet vehicles that crippled global markets because they didn't make financial sense", as well as his leadership in the acquisition of ailing rival investment bank Bear Stearns in March 2008. Winters was also "instrumental" in JPMorgan's joint venture with and later purchase of Cazenove.

However, Winters was ousted from his position in 2009 amid reports that he wanted to succeed the CEO Jamie Dimon. Black was replaced by Jes Staley who was named the new CEO of the investment bank, although Black stayed on as chairman of that unit until his retirement in 2011.

Renshaw Bay
In February 2011, Winters founded the hedge fund Renshaw Bay. He put up half the money, with investors Jacob Rothschild and Johann Rupert putting up the balance.

Standard Chartered
In February 2015, it was announced that Winters would replace Peter Sands as CEO of Standard Chartered in June 2015. Since he joined Standard Chartered, the share price has fallen, as has that of peer HSBC. Standard Chartered's executive pensions attracted some investor criticism in 2019, and some 36% of votes cast at StanChart's annual shareholder meeting in London were against its 2019 directors' remuneration report. 

In September 2022, Winters said Hong Kong is "open" and would attend the November 2022 Global Financial Leaders' Investment Summit in the city, despite quarantine measures for inbound travelers. Winters is scheduled to speak at the Summit, with the Hong Kong Democracy Council claiming that his presence, along with other financial executives, legitimizes the Hong Kong government's whitewashing of the erosion of freedoms in the city. Several members of Congress also warned that US financial executives should not attend the Summit, saying "Their presence only serves to legitimise the swift dismantling of Hong Kong's autonomy, free press and the rule of law by Hong Kong authorities acting along with the Chinese Communist Party."

Winters had earlier said in September 2022 that Hong Kong is "open". However, in a November 2022 interview, Winters, after the Summit, said of the current restrictions "I think you should scrap the whole thing. No tests on arrival, no tests on departure, and then just ask people to be responsible." He also said that testing is an issue because business travelers risk getting stuck in Hong Kong for around a week if they test positive.

Other activities
Winters was one of the commissioners of the UK Independent Commission on Banking after the 2008 financial crisis.

Winters participated in a charity video entitled "Life's a Pitch" alongside other senior financial managers, which was shown at the Young Vic theatre in London in 2013 and raised £250,000.

In 2020 Winters co-founded, with Mark Carney, the Task Force on Scaling Voluntary Carbon Markets, an initiative to increase trading of voluntary carbon offsets.

Recognition
Winters received a CBE in the 2013 Birthday Honours for services to the Economy and UK Financial Services Industry.

References

1961 births
Living people
American bankers
American chief executives of financial services companies
Commanders of the Order of the British Empire
Standard Chartered people
Businesspeople from Connecticut
Colgate University alumni
Wharton School of the University of Pennsylvania alumni